Triaenogenius is a genus of beetles in the family Carabidae, containing the following species:

 Triaenogenius arabicus Gestro, 1889
 Triaenogenius carinulatus (Fairmaire, 1887)
 Triaenogenius congoensis Basilewsky, 1959
 Triaenogenius corpulentus Chaudoir, 1877
 Triaenogenius denticulatus Basilewsky, 1959
 Triaenogenius ferox (Erichson, 1843)
 Triaenogenius gerstaeckeri (Chaudoir, 1877)
 Triaenogenius kochi Basilewsky, 1964
 Triaenogenius lugubrinus (Boheman, 1860)
 Triaenogenius lugubris (Schaum, 1863)
 Triaenogenius sculpturatus (Gerstaecker, 1867)

References

Anthiinae (beetle)